Pacha may refer to:
 Pacha (dish), a Persian word in many languages for boiled cow or sheep feet.
 Pacha (Inca mythology), a concept of space-time and the spheres of the cosmos

In Afghan politics:

 Bacha Khan or Pacha Khan, an Afghan leader
 Pacha Khan Zadran, a powerful militia leader, politician and Pashtun nationalist in the southeast of Afghanistan
 Sher Ali Bacha (1935–1998), Pashtun revolutionary leader

In Incan mythology:

 Mama Pacha, a dragoness fertility goddess who presided over planting and harvesting in Incan mythology
 Pacha Kamaq, the deity worshipped in the city of Pachacamac by the Ichma
 Uku Pacha, the underworld located beneath the Earth's surface in Incan mythology

In other fields:

 Alternative spelling of Pasha, a Turkish military and government rank
 Pacha (The Emperor's New Groove), a character in the Disney franchise The Emperor's New Groove
 Presidential Advisory Council on HIV/AIDS, a commission formed by then-President Bill Clinton in 1995 to provide recommendations on the U.S. government's response to the AIDS epidemic
 Pacha Group, a multinational nightclub franchise based in Spain